The following is a list of ecoregions in South Sudan, as identified by the Worldwide Fund for Nature (WWF).

Terrestrial ecoregions
by major habitat type

Tropical and subtropical moist broadleaf forests

 East African montane forests

Tropical and subtropical grasslands, savannas, and shrublands

 East Sudanian savanna
 Northern Acacia–Commiphora bushlands and thickets
 Northern Congolian forest–savanna mosaic
 Sahelian Acacia savanna
 Victoria Basin forest–savanna mosaic

Flooded grasslands and savannas

 Saharan flooded grasslands

Freshwater ecoregions

 Upper Nile
 Lake Turkana

References
 Burgess, Neil, Jennifer D’Amico Hales, Emma Underwood (2004). Terrestrial Ecoregions of Africa and Madagascar: A Conservation Assessment. Island Press, Washington DC.
 Thieme, Michelle L. (2005). Freshwater Ecoregions of Africa and Madagascar: A Conservation Assessment. Island Press, Washington DC.

Ecoregions of South Sudan
ecoregions
South Sudan